Neil William Rogers (born 22 June 1953) is an Australian former swimmer who competed in the 1972 Summer Olympics and 1976 Summer Olympics.

See also
 List of Commonwealth Games medallists in swimming (men)

References

1953 births
Living people
Australian male backstroke swimmers
Australian male freestyle swimmers
Australian male butterfly swimmers
Olympic swimmers of Australia
Swimmers at the 1972 Summer Olympics
Swimmers at the 1976 Summer Olympics
Commonwealth Games medallists in swimming
Commonwealth Games gold medallists for Australia
Commonwealth Games silver medallists for Australia
Commonwealth Games bronze medallists for Australia
Swimmers at the 1970 British Commonwealth Games
Swimmers at the 1974 British Commonwealth Games
20th-century Australian people
Medallists at the 1970 British Commonwealth Games
Medallists at the 1974 British Commonwealth Games